The Catholic Church in Namibia is part of the Catholic Church under the universal, direct jurisdiction of the supreme Vicar of Christ, the Bishop of Rome and the Catholic world, the Pope.

As of 2004, there were 246,000 Catholics in Namibia, about 13.7% of the total population. The country is divided into two dioceses, including one archdiocese together with an Apostolic Vicariate.

See also
List of Catholic dioceses in Namibia

References

Sources
 Archdiocese of Windhoek Catholic-hierarchy.org 

 
Namibia
Namibia